Thomas Lee Kirk (December 10, 1941 – September 28, 2021) was an American actor, best known for his performances in films made by Walt Disney Studios such as Old Yeller, The Shaggy Dog, Swiss Family Robinson, The Absent-Minded Professor, and The Misadventures of Merlin Jones, as well as the beach-party films of the mid-1960s. He frequently appeared as a love interest for Annette Funicello or as part of a family with Kevin Corcoran as his younger brother and Fred MacMurray as his father.

Kirk's career with Disney ended when news of his homosexuality threatened to become public. He struggled with drug addiction and depression for several years, appearing in a series of low-budget films before leaving the acting business in the mid-1970s. Thereafter, Kirk opened a carpet cleaning business and lived a mostly ordinary life, occasionally appearing at fan conventions. Kirk died at his home in Las Vegas, Nevada in 2021.

Early life
Kirk was born in Louisville, Kentucky, one of four sons. His father, Louis, was a mechanic who worked for the highway department; his mother, Lucy, was a legal secretary. Looking for better job opportunities, they moved to Downey in Los Angeles County, California, when Kirk was 15 months old.

In 1954, Kirk accompanied his elder brother Joe to an audition for a production of Eugene O'Neill's Ah, Wilderness! at the Pasadena Playhouse in Pasadena, California. "Joe was star struck," said Kirk. Joe was not cast, losing out to Bobby Driscoll, but Tommy was, and he made his stage debut opposite Will Rogers Jr. "It was five lines, it didn't pay anything, and nobody else showed up, so I got the part," recalled Kirk.

The performance was seen by an agent from the Gertz agency, who signed Kirk and succeeded in casting him in an episode of TV Reader's Digest, "The Last of the Old Time Shooting Sheriffs", directed by William Beaudine. Kirk's brother went on to become a dentist. Kirk was in demand almost immediately.

Disney career
In April 1956, Kirk was cast as Joe Hardy for The Mickey Mouse Club serial "The Hardy Boys: The Mystery of the Applegate Treasure". The show was filmed in June and early July 1956, and broadcast that October, at the start of the show's second season. The show and Kirk's performance were extremely well received and led to a long association between the actor and the studio.

In August 1956, Disney hired him and the former Mouseketeer Judy Harriet to attend both the Republican and Democratic presidential nominating conventions, for newsreel specials that later appeared on the show. Kirk also hosted short travelogues for the serial segment of the show's second season, sometimes with Annette Funicello. He did the voice-over narration for "The Eagle Hunters" and dubbing work for the Danish-made film Vesterhavsdrenge, shown on the Mickey Mouse Club as the serial "Boys of the Western Sea". Around this time, it was announced that Kirk would appear as Young Davy Crockett, but this did not happen.

Kirk's career received its biggest break yet when, in January 1957, Disney cast him as Travis Coates in Old Yeller (1957), an adventure story about a boy and his heroic dog. Kirk had the lead role in the film, a success at the box-office, and he became Disney's first choice whenever they needed someone to play an all-American teenager. Kevin Corcoran played his younger brother and the two of them were often cast as brothers. Later that year, Kirk and Corcoran were announced for the cast of Rainbow Road to Oz, a feature film based on the stories of L. Frank Baum, but this film was never produced.

In July 1958, Kirk was cast in The Shaggy Dog (1959), a comedy about a boy inventor, who under the influence of a magic ring, is repeatedly transformed into an Old English Sheepdog. This teamed him with Corcoran and two other Disney stars with whom he regularly worked, Fred MacMurray and Annette Funicello. According to Diabolique, "Much of the credit went to MacMurray; a lot of the credit should have gone to Kirk, whose easy-going boy next door charm made him the ideal American teen." Kirk said that when filming finished, Disney told him they did not have any projects for him and his contract would not be renewed. "I was thin and gangly and looked a mess ... I thought the whole world had fallen to pieces," he said. (At the same time, Film Daily called Kirk one of its five "male juveniles" of the year, the others being Tim Considine, Ricky Nelson, Eddie Hodges, and James MacArthur.)

With his Disney contract completed, Kirk went to Universal Pictures, where he played the male lead in the English dub of a Soviet animated feature, The Snow Queen, opposite Sandra Dee.

Shaggy Dog turned out to be a hit, gaining significantly larger rentals than Old Yeller, and Disney soon contacted Kirk, offering him another long-term contract and a role as middle son Ernst Robinson in another adventure film, Swiss Family Robinson (1960), starring John Mills, Dorothy McGuire, Janet Munro, and Corcoran. It remained Kirk's favorite movie. When he returned from filming in the West Indies, the studio signed him to two more movies.

Kirk followed up with a secondary role in a fantasy comedy starring Fred MacMurray, The Absent-Minded Professor (1961), another huge hit. Disney sent Kirk to England for The Horsemasters (1961), a youth-oriented horse riding film, which was made for U.S. television, but screened theatrically in some markets. He appeared once more with Munro and Funicello. That same year, Kirk played the support role of Grumio in the fairy tale fantasy Babes in Toyland, supporting Funicello, Ray Bolger, Ed Wynn and Tommy Sands. Kirk later described this film as "sort of a clunker ... but it has a few cute moments, it's an oddity", and enjoyed working with Ed Wynn. It was a box-office disappointment; so too was Moon Pilot (1962), a satirical comedy where Kirk played the younger brother of Tom Tryon.

Kirk acted in a family comedy with MacMurray, Bon Voyage (1962), with other family members played by Jane Wyman, Deborah Walley, and Corcoran. On set, Kirk did not get along with his onscreen parents. He later admitted that his own neediness made him view MacMurray as a surrogate father, a role MacMurray had no wish to fulfill. Kirk also had trouble with Jane Wyman, saying: "She was very mean to me. She went out of her way to be shitty ... but she was a total bitch and I think she was homophobic."' Kirk maintained better relationships with his onscreen brothers Kevin Corcoran and Tim Considine, who called Kirk "a monster talent".

Kirk starred with Funicello in another overseas-shot story which screened in the United States on TV, but was released in some countries theatrically: Escapade in Florence (1962). Newspaper columns occasionally linked Kirk and Funicello's names romantically, though in fact, they were never anything more than friendly coworkers.

In July 1962, Disney announced they would make The Happiest American with Kirk, but it was not made. Instead, he did a sequel to Absent Minded Professor, Son of Flubber (1963), his last film with MacMurray.

In 1963, Kirk reprised his role as Travis Coates in Disney's Savage Sam (1963), a sequel to Old Yeller, which reunited him with Corcoran and co-starred Brian Keith; it was not as well received as Old Yeller.

Disney then cast Kirk as student inventor Merlin Jones in The Misadventures of Merlin Jones (1964), again opposite Funicello. The film was directed by Robert Stevenson, who was frequently assigned Disney comedies. It became an unexpected box-office sensation, earning $4 million in rentals in North America, and Disney invited Funicello and him back to make a sequel, The Monkey's Uncle (1965). The Monkey's Uncle came out in July 1965 and was almost as successful as Merlin Jones.

Television 
Kirk began to work steadily in television throughout 1956 and 1957 in episodes of Lux Video Theatre ("Green Promise"), Frontier ("The Devil and Doctor O'Hara"), Big Town ("Adult Delinquents"), Crossroads ("The Rabbi Davis Story"), Gunsmoke ("Cow Doctor"), Letter to Loretta ("But for God's Grace", "Little League") and Matinee Theatre ("The Outing", "The Others" – a version of Turn of the Screw).

Kirk supported Angie Dickinson in a short feature called Down Liberty Road, a.k.a. Freedom Highway (1956), a short commercial travelogue produced by Greyhound Lines to promote their Scenicruiser buses.

Concurrent with his film career at Disney, Kirk continued to guest star on television series, such as The O. Henry Playhouse ("Christmas by Injunction"), The Californians (as Billy Kilgore in "Little Lost Man"), Matinee Theatre ("Look Out for John Tucker"), Playhouse 90 ("A Corner of the Garden"),The Millionaire ('Millionaire Charles Bradwell") (1959) Bachelor Father ("A Key for Kelly"), Mr. Novak, "Love in the Wrong Season" (1963), Angel ("Goodbye Young Lovers"), and The Alfred Hitchcock Hour ("Ten Minutes from Now") (1964).

Later films 
The news of Kirk's termination from Disney Studios was not made public, but Kirk was soon working for American International Pictures (AIP), which needed a leading man to co-star with Funicello in a musical they were preparing, The Maid and the Martian. Kirk was cast as a Martian who arrives on Earth and falls in with a bunch of partying teenagers. The movie was later retitled Pajama Party (1964) and was a box-office success. AIP then cast him in The Ghost in the Invisible Bikini (1966) with Deborah Walley. Soon after, Walley and he were put in It's a Bikini World, filmed in late 1965 under the direction of Stephanie Rothman. It was not released until 1967. Also for AIP, he appeared in a TV special, The Wild Weird World of Dr. Goldfoot (1965), made to promote Dr. Goldfoot and the Bikini Machine, which aired in November 1965. In December, he announced he would make three more films for Exclusive, starting with Teacher, Teacher, alongside Bob Denver and Dawn Wells but the film would not be made.

Following his work for AIP, Kirk spent the remainder of the 1960s making various low-budget films, including Village of the Giants (1965) for Bert I. Gordon; The Unkissed Bride (1966) for Jack H. Harris;  Track of Thunder and  Catalina Caper in 1967; and two films for Texan director Larry Buchanan: Mars Needs Women (1968) and It's Alive! (1969). Kirk got along well with Buchanan and the two would often spend time together off-set.

Kirk said he reached bottom in 1970 when he did two movies that were not Screen Actors Guild, Ride the Hot Wind and Blood of Ghastly Horror, causing him to almost lose his SAG card. "Finally, I said, to hell with the whole thing, to hell with show business, I'm gonna make a new life for myself, and I got off drugs, completely kicked all that stuff." In the 1970s, he was in a 1973 episode of The Streets of San Francisco and then starred in low-budget western My Name Is Legend (1975).  While filming My Name is Legend, Kirk was thrown from a horse and injured.

Personal life

Sexuality 
Kirk was gay. Due to public taboos against homosexuality, he had no way to find others like him and spent his teenage years having  "stolen, back alley" affairs. Kirk remained lonely and unhappy in the belief, later proved correct, that his sexuality would ruin his career.
  
While filming The Misadventures of Merlin Jones in 1963, 21 year old Kirk began a relationship with a 15 year old boy, and was caught having sex with him at a swimming pool in Burbank. The boy's mother informed Disney, who elected not to renew Kirk's contract. Walt Disney personally fired Kirk, but when Merlin Jones became an unexpected hit, Disney allowed him to return long enough to film a sequel, The Monkey's Uncle.

Kirk publicly came out as gay in a 1973 interview with Marvin Jones. At the time he was studying acting at the Lee Strasberg Theatre and Film Institute, while working as a busboy in a Los Angeles restaurant.

Arrests
On Christmas Eve 1964, Kirk was arrested for suspicion of possession of marijuana at a house in Hollywood. The district attorney's office subsequently refused to file a complaint against him on the marijuana charge. The city attorney's office, however, filed an illegal drugs charge, because officers found a vial of barbiturates in his car. This charge was dismissed by a judge in early January when Kirk's attorney established that the barbiturates had been prescribed by a physician. However, the damage to his career had been done. He was replaced on How to Stuff a Wild Bikini (1965) by Dwayne Hickman (intended as AIP's follow-up to Pajama Party), on The Sons of Katie Elder by Michael Anderson, Jr. and on Beach Ball by Edd Byrnes. His initial casting in these films was announced in late 1964.

Post-acting career

Kirk got over his drug addiction and gave up acting in the mid-1970s. He worked as a waiter and a chauffeur before going into the carpet-cleaning business in the San Fernando Valley area of Los Angeles, an operation which he ran for 20 years. In 1990, Kirk said he was "poor", but had "No bitterness. No regrets." He wrote an unproduced script about Abraham Lincoln and continued to act occasionally, including small roles in Streets of Death (1988) and Attack of the 60 Foot Centerfold (1995). He also enjoyed writing and occasionally appearing at retro film conventions.

Kirk was inducted as a Disney Legend on October 9, 2006, alongside his former co-stars Tim Considine and Kevin Corcoran. His other repeat co-stars, Annette Funicello and Fred MacMurray, had already been inducted in 1992 and 1987, respectively. Also in 2006, the first of Kirk's Hardy Boys serials was issued on DVD in the fifth "wave" of the Walt Disney Treasures series. At that point, he was retired with "a nice pension" and living in Redding, California.

Death
Kirk died at his Las Vegas, Nevada home on September 28, 2021, at the age of 79.

Filmography
Features
 1956 The Peacemaker as Tommy (uncredited)
 1957 Old Yeller as Travis Coates
 1957 The Snow Queen as Kay (voice in 1959 English dubbed version)
 1959 The Shaggy Dog as Wilbur "Wilby" Daniels
 1960 Swiss Family Robinson as Ernst Robinson
 1961 The Absent-Minded Professor as Biff Hawk
 1961 Babes in Toyland as Grumio
 1961 The Horsemasters (TV Series) as Danny Grant
 1962 Moon Pilot as Walter Talbot
 1962 Escapade in Florence (TV Series) as Tommy Carpenter
 1962 Bon Voyage! as Elliott Willard
 1963 Son of Flubber as Biff Hawk
 1963 Savage Sam as Travis Coates
 1964 The Misadventures of Merlin Jones as Merlin Jones
 1964 Pajama Party as Go Go The Martian
 1965 The Monkey's Uncle as Merlin Jones
 1965 Village of the Giants as Mike
 1966 The Ghost in the Invisible Bikini as Chuck Phillips
 1966 The Unkissed Bride as Ted
 1967 It's a Bikini World as Mike Samson / Herbert Samson
 1967 Catalina Caper as Don Pringle
 1967 Track of Thunder as Bobby Goodwin
 1968 Mars Needs Women (TV Movie) as Dop / Martian Fellow #1 / Mr. Fast / Seattle Sun Reporter
 1969 It's Alive! (TV Movie) as Wayne Thomas
 1970 Blood of Ghastly Horror as Sergeant Cross
 1971 Ride the Hot Wind as Captain Gregory Shank
 1975 My Name is Legend
 1988 Streets of Death as Frank Phillips
 1995 Attack of the 60 Foot Centerfold as Passenger
 1998 Little Miss Magic as Mr. Kenner
 1998 Billy Frankenstein as Blind Monk
 2000 Club Dead as Private Detective
 2001 The Education of a Vampire as Albert Kornfield
Short Subjects
 1956 Down Liberty Road

Television

TV Reader's Digest — "The Last of the Old Time Shooting Sheriffs" — January 17, 1955
Frontier — "The Devil and Doctor O'Hara" — February 5, 1956
Letter to Loretta — "But for God's Grace" — April 1, 1956
Big Town — "Adult Delinquents" — May 8, 1956
Crossroads — "The Rabbi Davis Story" — June 8, 1956
Gunsmoke — "Cow Doctor" — September 8, 1956
Letter to Loretta — "Little League" — September 16, 1956
The Mickey Mouse Club — "The Hardy Boys: The Mystery of the Applegate Treasure" — October 2–26, 1956
Matinee Theatre — "The Outing" — November 2, 1956
The Mickey Mouse Club — "The Eagle Hunters" — voice over narration
The Mickey Mouse Club — "Boys of the Western Sea" — voice over
Matinee Theatre — "The Others" (based on The Turn of the Screw) — February 15, 1957
The Mickey Mouse Club — "The Mystery of Ghost Farm" — September 13 — December 20, 1957
The Californians — "Little Lost Man" — December 3, 1957
Matinee Theatre — "Look Out for John Tucker" — June 4, 1958
Playhouse 90 — "A Corner of the Garden" — April 23, 1959
The Millionaire — "Millionaire Charles Bradwell" — June 10, 1959
Bachelor Father — "A Key for Kelly" — November 19, 1959
Angel — "Goodbye Young Lovers" — May 17, 1961
Mr. Novak — "Love in the Wrong Season" –December 3, 1963
Shindig! — "The Wild Weird World of Dr. Goldfoot" — November 18, 1965
The Streets of San Francisco — "Deadline" — February 15, 1973

References

Further reading

 
 
  reprinted at Campfire Video

External links
 
  — mentions Kirk
 
 

1941 births
2021 deaths
American male child actors
American male film actors
American male television actors
People from Downey, California
Male actors from Los Angeles
American gay actors
20th-century American male actors
Male actors from Louisville, Kentucky
LGBT people from Kentucky
LGBT people from California
Disney people